Clay Township, Kansas may refer to:

 Clay Township, Butler County, Kansas
 Clay Township, Reno County, Kansas

See also 
 List of Kansas townships
 Clay Township (disambiguation)

Kansas township disambiguation pages